Saleemul Huq  (born 1952) is a Bangladeshi-British scientist and has been the Director of the International Centre for Climate Change & Development (ICCCAD) based in Bangladesh, also Professor at Independent University, Bangladesh (IUB). He was elected one of Nature's 10 Ones in 2022.

He is an expert in the field of climate change, environment and development. He has worked extensively in the inter-linkages between climate change mitigation, adaptation and sustainable development, from the perspective of developing countries, particularly in the least developed countries (LDCs). He was a lead author of the chapter on Adaptation and Sustainable Development in the Third Assessment Report of the Intergovernmental Panel on Climate Change (IPCC), and was one of two coordinating lead authors of ‘Inter-relationships between adaptation and mitigation’ in the IPCC’s Fourth Assessment Report (2007).

In addition he has contributed to the Fifth Assessment Report of the IPCC. He is also a Senior Fellow at the International Institute for Environment & Development (IIED) based in the UK and Senior Adviser on Locally Led Adaptation with Global Centre on Adaptation (GCA).

He strives to grow the capacity of Bangladesh stakeholders, while enabling people and international organizations to benefit from training in Bangladesh. His teaching experiences include the Imperial College London, the University of Dhaka and United Nations University. He was the founder and currently, the Chairman of the Bangladesh Centre for Advanced Studies (BCAS), a leading research and policy institute in Bangladesh.

Dr. Huq has attended all sessions of the Conference of the Parties (COP) to the United Nations Framework Convention on Climate Change (UNFCCC). He has been actively engaged as an adviser on adaptation, loss and damage and climate finance to the Least Developed Countries (LDC) group in the UNFCCC and provided trainings to LDC negotiators. He has also been involved as a board member of Climate Vulnerability Forum under UNFCCC.

He was awarded 2020 National Environment Award by the Government of Bangladesh for his contribution to the development of the environment.

Huq was appointed Officer of the Order of the British Empire (OBE) in the 2022 New Year Honours for services to combating international climate change.

Life

Education 
Huq received his early education in Germany, Indonesia, and Kenya. He later went and received B.Sc in Botany from the Imperial College at London University in the United Kingdom in 1975, and a DIC as well as a Ph.D. in Botany from the same university in 1978.

Career 
Before joining IIED, Huq was the director of the Bangladesh Center for Advanced Studies, which he founded in 1984. He was founding director of the International Centre for Climate Change and Development at the Independent University, Bangladesh. He has been involved in the work of the Intergovernmental Panel on Climate Change, for which he has served as the lead author and coordinating lead author in Working Group II, which focuses on impacts, vulnerability and adaptation.

Huq published reports and articles on climate change, particularly on adaptation to climate change. He is the lead author of the chapter on Adaptation and Sustainable Development in the third assessment report of the Intergovernmental Panel on Climate Change (IPCC).   He is a Senior Fellow in the Climate Change Group at the International Institute for Environment and Development (IIED) and the director of the International Centre for Climate Change and Development

Research contribution to UN SDGs 
As a researcher, Huq is contributing to the United Nations Sustainable Development Goals (SDGs). His work with the IPCC, and ICCCAD contributes significantly to Goals 13: Climate Action and Goal 17: Partnerships for the Goals. 

Under Goal 13 Huq’s research is helping to achieve the following targets:

 Target 13.3: Build knowledge and capacity to meet climate change
 Target 13.a: Implement the UN Framework Convention on Climate Change 
 Target 13.b: Promote mechanisms to raise capacity for planning and management

Awards and recognition
 Robert McNamara Fellowship from World Bank, Washington DC, USA, 1986–87
Duggan Fellowship from NRDC, Washington DC, USA, 1989.
Nobel Peace Prize – Prof. Saleemul Huq contributed to the reports of the IPCC which was awarded the Nobel Peace Prize in 2007.
Burtoni Award (2007)
 National Environment Award (2020)
 Nature's 10 (2022)

References

External links
 
 
Website Bio

Living people
Bangladeshi expatriates in the United Kingdom
Bangladeshi botanists
1952 births
British botanists
Naturalised citizens of the United Kingdom
Officers of the Order of the British Empire
Alumni of Imperial College London
Environmental scientists